The 2018 NASCAR Whelen Modified Tour was the thirty-fourth season of the Whelen Modified Tour (WMT), a stock car racing tour sanctioned by NASCAR. It began with the Performance Plus 150 presented by Safety-Kleen at Myrtle Beach Speedway on 17 March and concluded with the Sunoco World Series 150 at Thompson Speedway Motorsports Park on 14 October. Doug Coby entered the season as the defending Drivers' champion. 2018 marked the second season of the unification of the Whelen (Northern) Modified Tour and the Whelen Southern Modified Tour. Justin Bonsignore won the championship, 97 points ahead of Chase Dowling.

Drivers

Schedule
On 22 November 2017, NASCAR announced the 2018 schedule. Charlotte was dropped from the schedule. The All-Star Shootout did not count towards the championship. The Icebreaker 150, the Thompson 125 and the Musket 250 were broadcast live on FansChoice.tv. Eleven of the seventeen races in the season were televised on NBCSN on a tape delay basis.

Notes

Results and standings

Races

Notes
1 – There was no qualifying session for the All-Star Shootout. The starting grid was decided with a random draw.
2 – The qualifying session for the Miller Lite 200 was cancelled due to weather. The starting line-up was decided by Practice results.

Drivers' championship

(key) Bold – Pole position awarded by time. Italics – Pole position set by final practice results or Owners' points. * – Most laps led.

Notes
‡ – Non-championship round.
1 – Calvin Carroll, Walter Sutcliffe Jr., Matt Swanson and Ronnie Williams received championship points, despite the fact that they did not start the race.
2 – Gary Putnam qualified in the No. 77 for Ryan Preece.

See also

2018 Monster Energy NASCAR Cup Series
2018 NASCAR Xfinity Series
2018 NASCAR Camping World Truck Series
2018 NASCAR K&N Pro Series East
2018 NASCAR K&N Pro Series West
2018 NASCAR Pinty's Series
2018 NASCAR PEAK Mexico Series
2018 NASCAR Whelen Euro Series

References

External links